Carlos Altamirano Toledo (born 28 March 1946) is a Mexican politician affiliated with the Party of the Democratic Revolution. As of 2014 he served as Deputy of the LX Legislature of the Mexican Congress representing Oaxaca.

References

External links
 

1946 births
Living people
Politicians from Oaxaca
Party of the Democratic Revolution politicians
21st-century Mexican politicians
Instituto Politécnico Nacional alumni
Deputies of the LX Legislature of Mexico
Members of the Chamber of Deputies (Mexico) for Oaxaca